Calliostoma poupineli is a species of sea snail, a marine gastropod mollusk in the family Calliostomatidae.

Description
The height of the shell attains 12 mm. The imperforate shell has an elevated-conical shape. Its apex is acute. The spire is ornamented all over with close obliquely grained spiral riblets, 2 supra marginal riblets stronger. The shell is shining and subcrystalline. It is fleshy-white, marked by remote reddish dots on the supra sutural rib. The 8 whorls are separated by impressed sutures. They are subconcave above, a little tumid and very obtusely subcarinated below. Thebase of the shell is plano-convex. The oblique aperture is subrhomboidal. The throat is pearly and sulcate inside, brilliantly nacreous, the pearl not attaining to the edge of the lip, which is sharp and finely crenulated. The columellar margin is thick, subvertical, with a small tubercle.

Distribution
This marine species occurs off New Caledonia.

References

 Marshall, B.A., 1995. Calliostomatidae (Mollusca: Gastropoda: Trochoidea) from New Caledonia, the Loyalty Islands, and the northern Lord Howe Rise. Résultats des Campagnes Musorstom 14 (Bouchet, P., ed.). Memoires de la Muséum National d’Histoire Naturelle 167: 381–458. 
 Herbert D.G. (1996) A critical review of the trochoidean types in the Muséum d'Histoire naturelle, Bordeaux (Mollusca, Gastropoda). Bulletin du Muséum national d'Histoire naturelle, Paris, ser. 4, 18 (A, 3–4): 409–445

External links

poupineli
Gastropods described in 1875